The Coronet Theatre is a theatre located at 366 North La Cienega Boulevard in Los Angeles, California.  During its peak in the mid 20th century, is was a legitimate theatre and experimental cinema venue, showing the work of people such as Kenneth Anger, Man Ray, Peter Berg, and Richard Vetere. Over the years its stage has hosted such stars as John Houseman, Charles Laughton, Charlton Heston, Buster Keaton, Ethel Waters, James Coburn, George C. Scott, Carol Burnett, Noah Wyle, and Glenn Close.

The Coronet Theatre building was commissioned and built in 1947 by Frieda Berkoff of the Russian dancing family, the Berkoffs. Frieda and her daughter, Petrie Robie ran the building until 1996 when they sold it to Deborah Del Prete and Gigi Pritzker. In 2008 it was sold to Hersel Saeidy  and rented to Mark Flanagan, the owner of Los Angeles's  Club Largo.  Flanagan moved his entire operation to the new location and renamed it Largo at the Coronet.  It now operates as a music and comedy club.

On July 6, 2020, the late night talk show Conan began filming from the Coronet Theatre with limited on-site staff and no audience, as part of a transition from at-home production necessitated by the COVID-19 pandemic (and marking the first U.S. late-night show to transition from at-home episodes); the show's usual set at Warner Bros. Studios, Burbank had already been dismantled. Conan remained at the Coronet through its series finale on June 24, 2021, with its final two weeks of episodes admitting a fully-vaccinated audience.

In 2022, the building was nominated for a historic-cultural monument, HCM,  designation in the city of Los Angeles with the goal of officially being recognized for its dynamic history and significant cultural contribution to Los Angeles.

Selected list of productions 
 first production: 1947 Thornton Wilder's The Skin of Our Teeth (west coast premiere)
 1947 Bertolt Brecht's Galileo Galilei (world premiere)
</ref>
 1961 Edna St. Vincent Millay's Conversation at Midnight (world premiere)
 1969 John Herbert's Fortune and Men's Eyes (1969 west coast premiere)
 1998 Joe DiPietro and Jimmy Roberts's I Love You, You're Perfect, Now Change
 1999 Howard Crabtree's When Pigs Fly
 2006 Jonathan Larson's Tick, Tick... Boom!
 2020 Conan O'Brien's talk show Conan tapes in the Coronet Theatre.

References

External links
Official website

Theatres completed in 1947
Theatres in Los Angeles
1947 establishments in California